New Orleans Monthly Review was an American magazine published from 1874 to 1876 in New Orleans, by Daniel K. Whitaker. The magazine appeared irregularly; in 1878 two issues appeared as New Orleans Quarterly Review.

References

Defunct magazines published in the United States
Little magazines
Magazines established in 1874
Magazines disestablished in 1876
Magazines established in 1878
Magazines disestablished in 1878
1878 establishments in the United States
Mass media in New Orleans
Magazines published in Louisiana